New Zealand Antarctic Place-Names Committee (NZ-APC) is an adjudicating committee established to authorize the naming of features in the Ross Dependency on the Antarctic continent. It is composed of the members of the New Zealand Geographic Board plus selected specialists on Antarctica. This committee works in collaboration with similar place-naming authorities in Australia, Great Britain and the United States to reach concurrence on each decision. The NZ-APC committee was established in 1956.

Names attributed by the committee

 Alberich Glacier, named after Alberich, king of the elves and chief of the Nibelungen
 Arena Saddle, named in conjunction with Arena Valley
 Brawhm Pass, named after the six party members of the University of New South Wales expeditions of 1964–65 and 1966–67
 Caliper Cove, named for descriptive features
 Canada Stream, named in conjunction with Canada Glacier
 Cape Crossfire, named for descriptive features
 Cuneiform Cliffs, named for descriptive features
 Foggy Pass, named for area weather features
 Frame Ridge, named after Alexander Oswald Frame, paleontology technician
 Marshall Stream, named in conjunction with the Marshall Valley
 Mount Burrows, named after A.L. Burrows
 Mount Jennings, named  after Peter Jennings, field assistant and mechanic
 Slump Mountain, named for descriptive features
 Tousled Peak, named for descriptive features

See also
New Zealand Geological Survey Antarctic Expedition

References

Further reading

Antarctic agencies
New Zealand and the Antarctic
Organisations based in Wellington
1956 establishments in New Zealand
Government agencies established in 1956
Geographical naming agencies
Names of places in Antarctica
Ross Dependency